Guy is the 1988 debut studio album by American R&B band Guy. Released on June 13, 1988 by Uptown Records. It was produced by group founder Teddy Riley and manager Gene Griffin. The album peaked at number 27 on the Billboard 200 chart. In July 1994, it was certified double platinum by the Recording Industry Association of America, for shipments of two million copies in the United States. In 2007, to commemorate the 20th anniversary of the album, Geffen Records reissued the recording complete with a remastered version of the original album and a second CD of remixes.

Background 
The origins of Guy came about when Aaron Hall and Timmy Gatling worked at the same clothing store, Abraham & Straus in New York. Riley was introduced to Hall by way of Gatling and the three then decided to form a group. Riley and Gatling were in a group prior to forming Guy called Kids At Work. Producer and manager Gene Griffin introduced them to Uptown Records founder Andre Harrell, who immediately signed the trio. After they were signed, they moved to Washington, D.C. to live with Griffin. However, things went south after Hall and Gatling were fighting the entire time of the recording. Gatling then left the group and was replaced by Aaron's younger brother Damion Hall. The eventual reasons of Gatling's departure from the group were issues with the contract and pressuring personal relationships during the time, although he was credited and earned royalties by his contribution of writing and producing.

Recording 
The album was recorded at several studios in New York—Chung King Studios, Sound Works Studios, and Unique Studios in New York City, Hillside Studios in Englewood, and Quantum Studios, Jersey City. The recording sessions were engineered by Tony Bennett's son Dae Bennett and Dave Kowalski. The album was mixed by Timmy Regisford, who would work with Riley on a number of projects over the next few years.

Guy was initially recorded at the house of Riley's mother. The reason for it was because the group had no money to record like they wanted in a professional studio. Although they did get around to recording in a professional setting, in the end, they used most of the vocals recorded from home because Riley felt they sounded better. One of the songs on the album- "You Can Call Me Crazy"- was originally intended for singer Al B. Sure! for his debut album In Effect Mode. Griffin took the song back as he felt the album needed to be filled. In the end, they decided to keep the song on the album with Sure!'s vocals still on the song.

Another song on the album "Piece Of My Love" was the source of an urban legend for a number of years. It was assumed that Hall sang the words "dumb bitch" at the beginning of the track. The rumor was so widespread, it was even referenced by Common in his song "Reminding Me (Of Sef)", the first single from his 1997 album One Day It'll All Make Sense. In a 2000 interview with Vibe Magazine, Riley insisted that it wasn't what Hall was saying, but rather "come on, babe". To further support his claim, he played the master tapes and isolated Hall's vocals to prove otherwise. The album started recording in October 1987 and was completed in March 1988.

A new jack swing album, Guy incorporates hip hop, R&B, and funk styles.

Commercial performance 
Guy peaked at twenty-seven on the U.S. Billboard 200 and reached number one on the R&B Albums chart where it remained for five nonconsecutive weeks. The album was certified platinum in March 1989 and double platinum by July 1994.  In addition, Guy was the highest charting R&B album on the Billboard Year-End chart for 1989.

Critical reception 

Robert Christgau of The Village Voice gave the album an "A−" and recommended for listeners to "absorb the beats and focus in on Aaron Hall". He felt that the band "sound[s] like almost arrogantly anonymous light funksters" and found Riley and Hall underwhelming as soul singers, but stated, "where Bobby Brown and Al B. Sure! play the love man falsetto straight, Hall adds depth by straying toward the manly emotionalism of the church. And unlike most light funksters, Riley doesn't aspire to slow ones." John Leland of Spin viewed Guy as exemplary of contemporary new jack swing albums, which he felt all sound "low-budget, without effects or orchestra, but yet they're very sophisticated". Alex Henderson of AllMusic gave Guy five out of five stars in a retrospective review, crediting the album for doing "more than any other to make [new jack swing] so incredibly popular in the R&B world" and citing it as "one of the most seminal and influential releases of the late '80s".

The song "Groove Me" appears in the 2004 video game Grand Theft Auto: San Andreas on the radio station CSR 103.9, which plays new jack swing music.

Track listing

Personnel
Franklin D. – assistant engineer
Alan Friedman – assistant engineer
Alan Gregorie – assistant engineer
Jay Henry – assistant engineer
Dennis Mitchell – assistant engineer
Mario Salvati – assistant engineer
Dawn Thomas – composing
Dae Bennett – engineer
Dave Kowalski – engineer
Guy – executive producer
Andre Harrell – executive producer
Timmy Gatling – group member 
Timmy Regisford – mixing
Gene Griffin – vocals, producer, arranger
Teddy Riley – vocals, producer, arranger, keyboards, drum programming
Louil Silas, Jr. – remixing
Aaron Hall – vocals
Tammy Lucas – background vocals

Charts

Weekly charts

Year-end charts

Certifications

See also
List of number-one R&B albums of 1989 (U.S.)

References

External links
 Guy at Discogs
 "The secret of his success" by Creative Loafing

1988 debut albums
Guy (band) albums
MCA Records albums
Uptown Records albums
Albums produced by Teddy Riley
Albums recorded at Chung King Studios